The 2017 FIBA 3x3 Africa Cup was the inaugural edition of the African 3x3 basketball event which was held between 3 and 5 November 017 in Lomé, Togo. This tournament was held at the covered outdoor venue of the Stade Omnisport Eyadema de Lomé.

Qualification
All African National Federations were invited to register a team for the FIBA 3x3 Africa Cup 2017.

Men's tournament

Pool stage

Pool A

Pool B

Pool C

Pool D

Knockout stage 
All times are local.

Final standings

Women's tournament

Pool stage

Pool A

Pool B

Knockout stage 
All times are local.

Final standings

Shoot-Out Contest
The shoot-out contest was played on 5 November.

References

External links
 Official website

2017 in 3x3 basketball
November 2017 sports events in Africa